Ruidíaz or Ruidiaz is a surname. Notable people with the surname include:

Alejandro Ruidiaz (born 1969), Argentine footballer
Raúl Ruidíaz (born 1990), Peruvian footballer 

Spanish-language surnames